This is a list of the National Register of Historic Places listings in Fulton County, Ohio.

It is intended to be a complete list of the properties on the National Register of Historic Places in Fulton County, Ohio, United States.  The locations of National Register properties for which the latitude and longitude coordinates are included below, may be seen in an online map.

There are 7 properties listed on the National Register in the county.

Current listings

|}

See also

 List of National Historic Landmarks in Ohio
 Listings in neighboring counties: Henry, Hillsdale (MI), Lenawee (MI), Lucas, Williams
 National Register of Historic Places listings in Ohio

References

 
Fulton